Chris Coward (born 23 July 1989) is an English footballer and brother to Andrew Coward, an actor that performed in The Jersey Boys musical. He came up through the Centre of Excellence youth system at Stockport County, where he became the youngest ever player to play in the Football League Cup aged 16 years and one month. He played for Northwich Victoria and Ashton United on loan, but was released by Stockport in June 2008. He played for Hyde United during the 2008–09 season.

References

External links

Profile at stockportcounty.co.uk
Appearances for Hyde United

1989 births
Living people
English footballers
Stockport County F.C. players
Northwich Victoria F.C. players
Ashton United F.C. players
Hyde United F.C. players
People from Crumpsall
Association football forwards